In the London Protocol signed on 12 September 1944, the Allies of World War II (then without France) agreed on dividing Germany into three occupation zones after the war.

History

The 1st EAC Zone Protocol

The first zone protocol was drawn up at the meeting of the European Advisory Commission (EAC) on 12 September 1944 and signed by John Gilbert Winant (USA), William Strang (UK) and Fedor Gusev (USSR) at Lancaster House in London, and described the first notions of the boundary between the one to be created: Eastern, Northwestern, and Southwestern.

The zones in Germany and the three parts of the area of Greater Berlin to be created. The basis of the ideas are the borders of Germany from 31 December 1937 (de) and Greater Berlin from 27 April 1920.

The north-western and south-western zones in Germany and Greater Berlin have not yet been assigned as British or American sub-areas. The relevant text passages provided for this are only documented with spaces, whereas the eastern zone and the north-eastern zone of Greater Berlin are already marked directly with "USSR".

In terms of borders, the western borders of Thuringia, Anhalt and the Prussian province of Saxony are referred to. This means that the areas east of the Werra and west of the Elbe were not - as was often published - "exchanged for West Berlin", but the areas in the west of the Elbe were already intended to be part of the Eastern Zone.

Original text:

The Soviet zone was supposed to encompass the eastern part of Germany, including the explicitly mentioned East Prussia, and no cession of areas to Poland was planned.

The border between the two western zones (and here not yet assigned to any occupying power) was defined as follows:

This would have meant that the present-day states of Bavaria and Baden-Württemberg as well as the Palatinate, which previously belonged to Bavaria, and the southern part of the People's State of Hesse would have come to the southwestern (i.e. later American) zone, the Rhine province belonging to Prussia and the province of Hesse-Nassau and the northern part of the People's State of Hesse (Upper Hesse province) to the north-western, i.e. British. The people's state of Hesse would have been divided by the layout of the occupation zones. This would have cut up the Frankfurt am Main area.

The (supplementary) 2nd EAC zone protocol

The main points of this smaller protocol, also drawn up in London on 14 November 1944, are:

Allocation of the north-west zone of Germany and the areas of Berlin to the British occupation (replacement of the spaces mentioned)
Allocation of the south-west zone of Germany and the areas of Berlin to the American occupation (replacement of the spaces mentioned)
First ideas about the joint use of the ports of Bremen and Bremerhaven
More detailed description of the intended boundaries between the individual zones

The demarcation between the two western zones has been corrected as follows:

The description reads difficult because the flow direction of the Rhine is reversed in it and the points "where the River Rhine leaves the southern frontier of Hesse-Nassau" actually are the ones where the river in this province into flows. However, the People's State of Hesse ("Hessen-Darmstadt") is mentioned for the first time in the Second Protocol, which did not appear in the first Protocol.

In terms of content, the Prussian province of Hesse-Nassau was now assigned to the (now called American) southwest zone, while the Bavarian Palatinate was assigned to the (now officially British) northwest zone. This resolved the above-described conflict of a zone border right through the Frankfurt metropolitan area. By defining the Rhine as a zone boundary in the Hessian people's state, the Hesse state was now divided along the river; the parts of the Rheinhessen province on the left bank of the Rhine were assigned to the British zone, the remaining parts of the country to the American zone. The city of Mainz, situated on both sides of the river, and its half on the right bank of the Rhine, was particularly affected by this the south-west zone, the districts on the left bank of the Rhine including the city center were assigned to the north-west zone.

The (supplementary) 3rd EAC zone protocol
The main points of this last of the protocols, written on 26 July 1945, are:

The geographical allocation and description of a new French zone of occupation, known as the West Zone, the proposed occupation area for troops of the French Republic (from 1949 Troupes d’occupation en Allemagne, TOA) in Germany,
the regulation of the assignment of the Bavarian district of Lindau on Lake Constance to the western zone, which was previously part of the south-western zone intended for the occupation by US armed forces. This should allow a direct transition for French troops to the French zone in Austria, as well
a regulation of US-American rights of use of an enclave around Bremen, so that the transfer to the ports of Bremen should be made easier for the occupying forces of the US. The area initially included Bremen, Wesermünde (from 1947 Bremerhaven), the Wesermarsch, Osterholz and the western part of the Cuxhaven district.

The introduction of a proposed, but not yet planned in detail, French occupation zone was entirely at the expense of the areas of the two previous western zones.

The zone protocol was sent to the governments of the four allied powers on 26 July. Details of the boundaries of the French sector in the northwest part of Greater Berlin were not included, only the statement that this sector should be formed from the two United Kingdom and the United States. [8th]

The territories of the new or previous zones (excluding the eastern ones) were planned in the third protocol as follows:

The procedure for planning a French occupation zone deviated massively from the previous orientation towards German state and Prussian provincial borders, the only exception to which was the new Rhine border between Mannheim and Wiesbaden. Instead, completely new borders were planned along previous administrative districts and counties. In addition to Hesse, which was already divided in the 2nd Protocol, other regions were affected by the division:

the Rhineland, whose northern half (administrative districts Düsseldorf, Cologne and Aachen) came to the British zone and the southern administrative districts of Trier and Koblenz to the French zone,
the historic Duchy of Nassau, whose western districts (on the Middle Rhine, in the Taunus and in the Westerwald) have now been separated and become part of the French zone,
Baden, of whose territory only the northern half was to belong to the US zone and the southern half to the French zone,
Wuerttemberg, not mentioned by name in the text, which was also divided into a north and a south half, in parts not even along district boundaries, but along the Stuttgart-Ulm autobahn, this traffic route remaining under US control
as well as Bavaria, which with the exception of the Palatinate belongs completely to the US zone, in that its district of Lindau changed to the French zone in order to create a land connection between the French zones in Germany and Austria, as already mentioned.

Aftermath

1945
Poland's western border and Konigsberg area 
At the Potsdam conference it was determined with regard to the borders of the Soviet zone that the areas east of the Oder and Lusatian Neisse are provisionally subject to Polish administration and are not to be treated (in contrast to the zone protocols) as part of the Soviet zone. The Königsberg area (from 1946 Kaliningrad Oblast), the northern part of East Prussia, was no longer part of this zone.

Airfields Gatow and Staaken 
In order to enable the British and Soviet occupying forces to use the two airfields, immediately after the Potsdam Conference, an area swap was carried out on the western city limits of Berlin for the locations or parts of Weststaaken, Weinmeisterhöhe, the Seeburger Zipfel and the eastern part of Groß Glienicke.

1947
Ports of Bremen 
After Wesermünde had been spun off from the enclave in the British zone, which was under US administration, in 1947 the US area was reduced to the territory of the Free Hanseatic City of Bremen, which was newly founded in the same year.

References

Sources
 

1944 treaties